Tipperary South was a parliamentary constituency represented in Dáil Éireann, the lower house of the Irish parliament or Oireachtas, from 1948 to 2016. The method of election was proportional representation by means of the single transferable vote (PR-STV).

History and boundaries
It was in operation from the 1948 general election when the former Tipperary constituency was divided into Tipperary North and Tipperary South. At its abolition, it comprised most of the county of South Tipperary and a small portion of County Waterford to the south of Clonmel. The principal population centres were Tipperary, Clonmel, Cashel, Carrick-on-Suir, and Cahir.

The Electoral (Amendment) Act 2009 defined the constituency as:

It was abolished at the 2016 general election and succeeded by the new Tipperary constituency.

TDs

Elections

2011 general election

2007 general election

2002 general election

2001 by-election
Following the death of Fine Gael TD Theresa Ahearn, a by-election was held on 30 June 2001. The seat was won by the Fine Gael candidate Tom Hayes.

2000 by-election
Following the death of Labour Party TD Michael Ferris, a by-election was held on 22 June 2000. The seat was won by the Independent candidate Séamus Healy.

1997 general election

1992 general election
Seán Treacy was Ceann Comhairle at the dissolution of the 26th Dáil and therefore deemed to be returned automatically. The constituency was treated as a three-seater for the purposes of calculating the quota.

1989 general election
Seán Treacy was Ceann Comhairle at the dissolution of the 25th Dáil and therefore deemed to be returned automatically. The constituency was treated as a three-seater for the purposes of calculating the quota.

1987 general election

November 1982 general election

February 1982 general election

1981 general election

1977 general election
Seán Treacy was Ceann Comhairle at the dissolution of the 20th Dáil and therefore deemed to be returned automatically. The constituency was treated as a two-seater for the purposes of calculating the quota.

1973 general election

1969 general election

1965 general election

1961 general election

1957 general election

1954 general election

1951 general election

1948 general election

See also
Dáil constituencies
Politics of the Republic of Ireland
Historic Dáil constituencies
Elections in the Republic of Ireland

References

External links
Oireachtas Members Database

Dáil constituencies in the Republic of Ireland (historic)
1948 establishments in Ireland
Constituencies established in 1948
Historic constituencies in County Tipperary
2016 disestablishments in Ireland
Constituencies disestablished in 2016